Loga Nayaga Shaniswara temple is located at Puliakulam, Coimbatore, Tamil Nadu. The temple is located adjacent to Puliakulam Mariamman temple and the main deity is Shani. A crow which is the mount of Shani, made also of iron stands in front of the main deity.

References

Hindu temples in Tamil Nadu
Buildings and structures in Coimbatore